Ifan Phillips (born 29 January 1996) is a Welsh rugby union player who played for the Ospreys as a hooker. He is a Wales under-20 international.

Phillips made his debut for the Ospreys in 2017 having previously played for the club's academy and Carmarthen Quins.

Phillips was involved in a serious motorbike accident in December 2021, as a result of which one of his legs was amputated, effectively ending his rugby career.

References

External links 
Ospreys Player Profile

1996 births
Living people
Ospreys (rugby union) players
Rugby union players from Carmarthenshire
Welsh rugby union players
Scarlets players
Rugby union hookers